Phukan or Phookan or Phukon is a surname of assamese origin and a Paik officer. Now the descendants' clans use it as a surname. This is usually used among the people of Assamese Hindu origin and Assamese Brahmins and ahoms.

Notable Persons

Anandaram Dhekial Phukan (1829–1859), one of the pioneers of Assamese literature in the Arunodoi era
Anup Phukan, Indian politician
Ayush Phukan, Indian singer
Babul Phukan (1968–2013), former Indian footballer from Assam
Bastab Deodhai Phukan, the chief of ULFA's Enigma Force and also a commander of the outfit's 28th battalion
Bhadra Phukan, Freedom fighter, Leader of 2942's Sarupathar train derailment activity and school friend of Kushal Konwar
Bhrigu Phukan, leader of Asom Gana Parishad and a cabinet minister in Government of Assam
Biju Phukan (1947–2017), senior Assamese cine-actor of great fame
Chiring Phukan, an official of the state of Ahom in medieval Assam
Dhrubajyoti Phukan, film score composer
Hemanga Phukon, IRS Officer
Kabin Phukan, Assamese poet
Mahendra Nath Deka Phukan (1903–1974), artist, poet, journalist and craftsman of Assam
Mitra Phukan, Indian author who writes in English
Nilmani Phookan Jr, Assamese poet
Nilmoni Phukan Sr (1880–1978), Assamese poet and freedom fighter
Pranati Phukan (born 1963), former minister, deputy speaker and member of Assam Legislative Assembly
Prasanta Phukan (born 1954), Bharatiya Janata Party politician from Assam
Sailendu Nath Phukan (1937–2018), Indian judge of the Supreme Court of India
Shashwati Phukan, Assamese Singer
Shreya Phukan, Indian singer
Siddhartha Phukan, SULFA leader
Suren Phukon, Freedom fighter, Leader of 1942's Sarupathar train derailment activity
Suresh Phukan, singer, lyricist, music composer, writer, poet, actor, director, social activist and professor
Tarun Ram Phukan (1877–1939), orator, writer and Assamese politician

See also
Piyoli Phukan, black & white Assamese language film released in 1955

References

Indian surnames
Ahom kingdom
Assamese-language surnames